Soko Grad ("Falcon Town") is the name of numerous medieval cities and fortresses throughout the Balkan Peninsula.

Serbia
 Soko Grad (Sokobanja), near the spa town of Sokobanja, Serbia
 Soko Grad (Ljubovija), near the town of Ljubovija, Serbia

Bosnia
 Soko Grad (Gračanica), near the town of Gračanica, Bosnia and Herzegovina
 Soko Grad (Šipovo), near the small town of Šipovo, Bosnia and Herzegovina
 Soko Grad (Bihać), near the town of Bihać, Bosnia and Herzegovina

Croatia
 Soko fortress (Konavle), above the town of Konavle, Croatia

Моntenegro
 Soko Grad (Piva), near the confluence of rivers Piva and Tara, Montenegro
 Soko Grad (Štitar), above the village of Štitar, Montenegro